Allerston, formerly Allersville, is an unincorporated community in Alberta, Canada within the County of Warner No. 5.

The community has the name of Jacob Allers, a pioneer citizen.

All that remains of Allerston is a Roman Catholic Church and the Allerston Hall with baseball diamonds. The church was built in 1911 and opened on July 28, 1912. The church is still in use today. It was moved to a new foundation  to the north. There is a cemetery behind the church. The Allerston Hall is still use for the annual Fall Bazar.

Attractions 
Writing-on-Stone Provincial Park, is one of the largest areas of protected prairie in the Alberta park system, and serves as both a nature preserve and protection for the largest concentration of rock art, created by Plains People. There are over 50 rock art sites, with thousands of figures, as well as numerous archeological sites.

See also 
 List of communities in Alberta
 Roman Catholic Diocese of Calgary

References 

County of Warner No. 5
Unincorporated communities in Alberta
Ghost towns in Alberta